Christy Renea Martin (born June 12, 1968) is an American former professional boxer. Competing from 1989 to 2012, she held the WBC female super welterweight title in 2009. In 2010, Martin was stabbed and shot by her husband. He was subsequently found guilty of attempted second-degree murder and sentenced to 25 years in prison. Martin was the first female boxer elected to the Nevada Boxing Hall of Fame in 2016, and was also elected to the International Boxing Hall of Fame in 2020, which was the first year that women were on the ballot.

Early life
Martin was born Christy Renea Salters on June 12, 1968 in Mullens, West Virginia. and attended Mullens High School.

She played various sports as a child including Little League baseball and all-state basketball. She attended Concord College in Athens, West Virginia on a basketball scholarship and earned a B.S. in education.

Career
Martin is said to be “the most successful and prominent female boxer in the United States” and the person who “legitimized” women’s participation in the sport of boxing. She began her career fighting in “Toughwoman” contests and won three consecutive titles. She then began training with boxing coach, Jim Martin, who became her husband in 1991.

Martin started her professional boxing career at the age of 21 with a six-round draw with Angela Buchanan in 1989. She had her first training under the direction of Charlie Sensabaugh of Daniels West Virginia. Martin won a rematch with Buchanan one month later with a second round knockout. Andrea DeShong then beat Martin in a five-round decision. Martin then had nineteen consecutive wins, including two against Jamie Whitcomb and Suzanne Riccio-Major as well a rubber match win against Buchanan. On October 15, 1993, Martin defeated Beverly Szymansky. Martin won by knocking out Szymansky in three rounds. In her first title defense, she fought to a draw against debutante Laura Serrano in Las Vegas.

Martin defended her title six more times, including a rematch with Szymansky, a fourth fight with Buchanan and defenses versus Melinda Robinson and Sue Chase, winning all of them, before the fight that many credit for putting women's boxing on the sports fans' radar took place: On March 16, 1996, she and Deirdre Gogarty fought what many consider a great fight, in front of Showtime cameras. Martin got the decision, and after that bout, she began to gain more celebrity, even appearing on the cover of Sports Illustrated once shortly afterwards. (Specifically, on April 15, 1996, Martin became the first female boxer to appear on the cover of Sports Illustrated; the headline read, "The Lady Is a Champ".)

Martin made a special guest appearance on the television show Roseanne in season 9, episode 6, "Pampered to a Pulp".

Martin won her next eight bouts including wins against Robinson, DeShong, Marcela Acuña and Isra Girgrah. Martin lost her title in a 10-round decision loss to Sumya Anani in 1998. Martin then won her next nine fights including wins against Belinda Laracuente, Sabrina Hall and Kathy Collins.  Martin won her next two fights by ten-round decisions against Lisa Holeywine and Mia St. John.

In 2003 Martin fought Laila Ali and lost by a knockout in the fourth round.

Martin's next fight in 2005 was a second-round knockout against Lana Alexander in Lula, Mississippi.

In 2005 a fight with Lucia Rijker, titled "Million Dollar Lady", was canceled because Rijker ruptured her Achilles during training.

On September 16, 2005, in Albuquerque, New Mexico, Martin lost a 10-round unanimous decision to Holly Holm. Martin was beaten by the 23-year-old southpaw, with all three judges scoring for Holm.

Martin holds a record of 49 wins, 7 losses and 3 draws with 31 wins by knockout. She is a frequent visitor of the International Boxing Hall Of Fame annual induction ceremonies, and an avid autograph signer. She has fought on the undercard of boxers Mike Tyson, Evander Holyfield, Félix Trinidad and Julio César Chávez.

Martin was promoted by Don King, and was the first woman to sign with him. He signed Martin in October 1993 following her third-round knockout win against Beverly Szymanski.

Martin was nicknamed The Coal Miner's Daughter in reference to her father's occupation.

Martin announced on January 19, 2011, that she would be fighting again in hopes of her 50th career win on the undercard of the Ricardo Mayorga vs Miguel Cotto Fight at the MGM Grand Hotel in Las Vegas, Nevada, on March 12, 2011, against Dakota Stone in a rematch of their 2009 Fight. The fight was postponed due to a rib injury to Martin. The rescheduled rematch  took place June 4, 2011 at Staples Center in Los Angeles on the Julio Cesar Chavez Jr. vs Sebastian Zbik undercard.   Dakota Stone prevailed by TKO with :51 left as Martin broke her right hand in 9 places on a punch in the 4th round and could not continue.

In 2016, she became the first female boxer inducted into the Nevada Boxing Hall of Fame. That same year, Sports Illustrated reported that she was working 2 jobs, as a substitute teacher and helping military veterans find work, and that she was dealing with the after effects of her career, including dealing with lack of stamina and double vision. In 2020 she was inducted into the International Boxing Hall of Fame; she was elected to it in 2019, the first year that women were on the ballot.

Professional boxing record

Attempted murder
On November 23, 2010, Christy Martin was stabbed several times and shot at least once in her torso and left for dead by her husband, 66-year-old James V. Martin. The attack reportedly occurred after an argument in their Apopka home. She survived the attack. On November 30, James Martin was arrested and taken to Orlando Regional Medical Center after he stabbed himself. He was booked in Orange County Jail and charged with attempted first degree murder and aggravated battery with a deadly weapon.

In April, 2012, James Martin was found guilty of attempted second-degree murder. 
He was sentenced two months later to 25 years in prison. He is currently serving his sentence at Graceville Correctional Facility in Graceville, Florida.

Personal life
Martin married former ring rival Lisa Holewyne on November 25, 2017. Martin is the CEO of Christy Martin Promotions, a boxing promotion company that has promoted many events in North Carolina since 2016 and will be promoting boxing events in Jacksonville, Florida and in other Southern United States cities.

Legacy
In 2021, Netflix released Untold: Deal with the Devil, a documentary chronicling Martin’s career and personal life.

References

External links
Official website
Christy Martin Female Boxer Biography

1968 births
Living people
American shooting survivors
American women boxers
Concord University alumni
Lesbian sportswomen
American LGBT sportspeople
LGBT people from West Virginia
People from Apopka, Florida
People from Mullens, West Virginia
Boxers from Florida
Boxers from West Virginia
LGBT boxers
Light-middleweight boxers
21st-century LGBT people
21st-century American women